Beata Botlhoko Kasale (24 May 1961 – 18 June 2018)  was a Botswana publisher and founding editor of The Voice Newspaper. With over 30 years in Journalism, Kasale co-founded The Voice Newspaper formerly The Francistowner Extra  in 1993 together with Donald Laurence Moore in Francistown and commonly referred to as “the mother of the media industry in Botswana”.

Life 
Kasale, popularly known as Aus-B in media circles, was the Strategic Advisor for the WAN-IFRA Women in News (WIN) in its formative years, the Acting Chairperson of the Botswana Media Consultative Council and a member of the Media Advisory Council. She was also a Commonwealth Elections Observer. 
 
At the helm of The Voice Newspaper, Kasale was a proponent of gender mainstreaming and equity in Botswana’s newsrooms. In 2014, at the World Editors Forum, she posted; “Women must make themselves visible. 
 
She also worked for several organisations as chief strategist, including International Media Women’s Foundation (IMWF), African Comprehensive HIV/AIDS Partnership (ACHAP), Commonwealth Secretariat, Commonwealth Press Union, Gender Links, Panos, Open Society Initiative (OSI), OSISA and AMARC.
 
As a Human Rights defender, Kasale entreated the Government of Botswana to assimilate the marginalised Basarwa (San people) into the larger Botswana society in order that they fully benefit from their country’s resources. Thus in 2010, the 4th President of the Republic of Botswana, Seretse Khama Ian Khama, bestowed upon Kasale the Presidential Certificate of Honour in recognition of her contribution to the development of Botswana through media and human rights advocacy.
 
In 2001, she published a Children’s book, The Treasure in the Garden with Heinemann, UK.

Kasale died in the early hours of 18 June 2018 after suffering for a long time from sugar diabetes at Bokamoso hospital at the age of 57.

A year after her passing in 2019, The Y-Care Charitable Organisation – a charity she had devotedly supported  honoured the late media personality and humanitarian by setting in motion the annual Marokolwane 20 km Charity Walk, whose beneficiaries include among others, Rasesa Primary School Library.

References 

Botswana journalists
1961 births

2018 deaths